María Mercedes Cuesta Concari (born 28 November 1973) is an Ecuadorian journalist and politician. She has worked in news programs in Gamavisión, Telesistema, TC Televisión, CRE, SíTV, Ecuavisa, and Teleamazonas. From 2017 to 2021, she served as a member of the National Assembly, which she was elected as part of Fuerza Ecuador, although she had separated from it in August 2019.

Early years
Cuesta was born in Guayaquil on 28 November 1973. She studied at the Nuevo Mundo Educational Center.

References

1973 births
Living people
People from Guayaquil
Ecuadorian women journalists
Women members of the National Assembly (Ecuador)
Members of the National Assembly (Ecuador)
21st-century Ecuadorian women politicians
21st-century Ecuadorian politicians